Ernesto Ráez Mendiola (20 May 1936 – 11 March 2021) was a Peruvian stage director, actor, and theater teacher.

References

Peruvian actors
1936 births
2021 deaths